Māmari Stephens (born 1970) is a law academic best known for her work creating He Papakupu Reo Ture: A Dictionary of Māori Legal Terms, a Māori-English a bi-lingual dictionary of legal terms. She identifies as being of Te Rarawa and Ngāti Pākehā descent.

Stephens has a background in classics and law at Victoria University of Wellington, where she is currently a Reader in Law. After graduating, she worked at Russell McVeagh in Wellington for 3.5 years.

In 2019 she was ordained as a priest in the Anglican Church in Aotearoa, New Zealand and Polynesia and is a part-time Māori Chaplain at Victoria University. She is on the Board of Trustees of the Wellington City Mission.

Legal Māori Project
Led by Stephens and Mary Boyce of University of Hawaiʻi at Mānoa, this FRST-funded project created the first ever Māori-English bi-lingual dictionary of legal terms, He Papakupu Reo Ture: A Dictionary of Maori Legal Terms. The project involved digitising historical texts, and many of the texts old enough to be out of copyright were released by the New Zealand Electronic Text Centre. The other outputs of the Legal Māori Project, including the dictionary, corpus and corpus browser, are all available at www.legalmaori.net as a part of the Māori Law Resource Hub, Te Pokapū Reo Ture.

Personal life
Stephens is married to Maynard Gilgen. They have three children and live in Wellington. She attends St Michael's Church, Kelburn, where she is responsible for youth ministry. Her family whakapapa links her to Wainui marae in Ahipara.

Selected publications
Social Security and Welfare Law in Aotearoa New Zealand (Thomsen and Reuters, 2019) 
He Papakupu Reo Ture: A Dictionary of Maori Legal Terms  (section winner of the Nga Kupu Ora Aotearoa Maori Book Awards.)
A Return to the Tohunga Suppression Act 1907, Victoria University Wellington Law Review, 32, 437

References

1970 births
Living people
Victoria University of Wellington alumni
Academic staff of the Victoria University of Wellington
Māori language revivalists
Te Rarawa people
New Zealand women academics
New Zealand Māori academics
New Zealand Māori women academics
Māori-language writers
New Zealand Māori religious leaders